Brae Burn Country Club is a golf course located in West Newton, Massachusetts. Designed by Donald Ross, Brae Burn has hosted seven USGA Championships, including the 1919 U.S. Open, and 1928 U.S. Amateur. Brae Burn is most noted for its diabolical greens, and classic layout.

History
Brae Burn Country Club is located in West Newton, at 326 Fuller Street. Henry B. Day, along with his brother Frank A. Day, were active in founding the club. Henry also served as the club president from 1921 to 1928. The original six-hole layout ran on both sides of Commonwealth Ave., using the founder’s home grounds and unoccupied land to lay out the course. The club was incorporated with a nine-hole course in 1897, used until 1903, when construction on a new eighteen-hole course was completed. It was on this layout that Brae Burn received much notoriety for its challenging layout, hosting the 1906 United States Women’s Amateur Champion, won by Harriot Curtis, condoner of the Curtis Cup.

In 1912, Scotsman Donald Ross underwent his first redesign of the original eighteen-hole layout. Following the success of his restoration came Brae Burn’s second United States Golf Association Championship, the 1919 United States Men’s Open Championship. The event was won by the formidable Sir Walter Hagen. In 1928 Donald Ross made a return visit to Brae Burn to revamp the course for the club’s hosting of the 1928 United States Men’s Amateur Championship. A modification of the eighteenth hole included a back tee, subsequently coined the “Jones Tee”, for eventual champion Robert Tyre “Bobby” Jones Jr.

Since 1928, the course has remained the same, only a few alterations to tee boxes and greens have been done. Brae Burn continued to host national championships, including the Curtis Cup in 1958 and 1970, and the U.S. Women’s Amateur in 1975. In Brae Burn’s centennial year, 1997, the U.S. Women’s Amateur returned, in which Italy’s first amateur champion, Silvia Cavalieri, defeated Robin Burke of the United States, 5&4. Today Brae Burn is a member of both the USGA and the Massachusetts Golf Association, and actively participates as a host club for various MGA events.

References 

Brae Burn Country Club. (1997). Brae Burn Country Club, 1897–1997, Centenary, One Hundred Years of Golf and Family Life. Walsworth Publishing Company.

External links

1897 establishments in Massachusetts
Buildings and structures in Newton, Massachusetts
Curtis Cup venues
Golf clubs and courses in Massachusetts
Golf clubs and courses designed by Donald Ross
Sports venues in Middlesex County, Massachusetts
Sports venues completed in 1897